Florence Ellen Hummerston ,  Hayman, (6 March 1889 – 31 December 1983) was an Australian politician. She was a City of Perth councillor between 1951 and 1969.

Biography

Early life
Hummerston was born on 6 March 1889 in Fremantle, Western Australia. Her father was George Hayman and her mother, Emily Hayman. She was educated at St Joseph's school and Underwood Business College.

Early career
After leaving school, she was employed in her father's business as a secretary and typist. After marrying Victor Hummerston, she soon focussed on raising her daughter. After Victor returned from serving in World War I, she managed a billiards hall, later operating a shop with her husband.

Public life
From the late 1910s, she became involved in charitable and philanthropic endeavours. She was involved in the Women’s Service Guilds of Western Australia, serving as vice president between 1937 and 1941. She was Western Australian Commander of the Women’s Australian National Service (WANS) and was involved with the establishment of the state branch of the Australian Women's Land Army. In 1943, as part of WANS, she helped set up the Wanslea Hostel. In 1954 she opened Meals on Wheels in Western Australia.

Political career
She was elected as a City of Perth councillor for the South Ward in 1951, becoming the first female councillor.

She was an unsuccessful Liberal and Country League candidate for the Western Australian Legislative Assembly seat of North Perth in 1953.

Honours
In 1960, she became an Officer of the Order of the British Empire (OBE) for services to social welfare.

The Florence Hummerston Kiosk in Perth is named for her, and housed the Florence Hummerston Day Care Centre between 1985 and 1998.

A pocket park on the corner of St Georges Terrace and Mount Street is named in her honour.

Personal life and death
She married Victor Hummerston in 1909 at St Patrick's Church in Fremantle. They had a daughter Emily (born 1910) who died at the age of 18 from kidney failure. She was widowed in 1973 when Victor died. She lived until 1983 when she died at Como aged 94. She was buried at Karrakatta Cemetery.

References

1889 births
1983 deaths
People from Fremantle
Perth City Councillors
Australian Officers of the Order of the British Empire
20th-century Australian politicians
19th-century Australian women
20th-century Australian women politicians
Burials at Karrakatta Cemetery
Women local councillors in Australia